Lingen (Ems) is a railway station located in Lingen, Lower Saxony, Germany. The station lies on the Emsland Railway (Rheine - Norddeich) and the train services are operated by Deutsche Bahn and WestfalenBahn.

Train services
The station is served by the following service(s):

Intercity services (IC 35) Norddeich - Emden - Münster - Düsseldorf - Köln - Bonn - Koblenz - Mainz - Mannheim - Stuttgart
Intercity services (IC 35) Norddeich - Emden - Münster - Düsseldorf - Köln - Bonn - Koblenz - Mainz - Mannheim - Karlsruhe - Konstanz
Regional services  Emden - Leer - Lingen - Rheine - Münster

Bus services
Outside the station is a bus station.

Gallery

References

External links
 

Railway stations in Lower Saxony
Railway stations in Germany opened in 1856